King Edward Street is a prominent street in the city of Perth, Scotland. St John's Place, which surrounds the ancient St John's Kirk, are the only junctions on King Edward Street.

Several notable buildings stand on King Edward Street, including Perth City Hall. The original city hall was constructed in 1844; it was replaced by today's structure in 1914. Prior to the 19th-century construction, what became King Edward Street was originally the home of the city's old flesh, butter and meal markets.

The rear (eastern side) of St John's Shopping Centre opens onto King Edward Street. Its construction in 1988 demolished St John's Square, with its residents relocated elsewhere in the city. The fifth incarnation of the Perth mercat cross stands to the east of the shopping centre. It was erected in 1913 in memory of Edward VII, who died three years earlier.

A £3-million pound project for the High Street and King Edward Street provided new seating, lighting and the laying of natural stone in 2010.

Listed buildings and structures 

 Perth City Hall (Category B listed)
 2–8 King Edward Street (Category B listed)
 22–26 King Edward Street (Category C listed)
 30–36 King Edward Street (Category C listed)

References 

Streets in Perth, Scotland
19th-century establishments in Scotland